Allah is a populated place located in Maricopa County, Arizona.

Geography

History
It was originally called "Brill's Ranch", but the name was changed due to its resemblance to a desert in a fictional novel, Garden of Allah. That name has since been shortened to its current form. Garden of Allah was founded as a resort in 1913 by John Sanger, who bought the Brill Ranch. The resort has been called "likely the first dude ranch in Arizona".

The YMCA opened a summer camp at the site in 1918. A post office operated briefly, from 1917 to 1919. Frances Sanger served as postmaster.

Allah's population was 100 in the 1960 census.

A rail stop was built to accommodate the area. The ruins of the Allah Railroad Station are still visible.

References

Further reading

Populated places in Maricopa County, Arizona